Deportes Concepción is a Chilean football club based in the city of Concepción, Biobio Region. They currently play at the third tier of the Chilean League system, the Segunda División.

The club was founded in 1966, by the organizations of several amateur clubs such as Galvarino, Liverpool, Juvenil Unido, Santa Fe and Club Lord Cochrane. The club is one of the most popular in the VIII region of Chile, their main rivals are Fernández Vial and Huachipato. The club played their home games at Estadio Ester Roa in Concepción, Chile, which seats 30,448 people.

History
The team joined the second level of the Chilean professional league in 1966 and won the tournament a year later gaining promotion to the Primera División de Chile.

In 1991 the team joined in representing Chile in the Copa Libertadores, they passed through the 1st round phase but lost in the round of sixteen against América de Cali.

In 1993 the club was relegated after finishing 15th of 16 teams, but the club bounced straight back by winning the second division title in 1994.

Concepción played their next big international tournament in 1999, they participated in the Copa CONMEBOL and made it all the way to the semifinals but lost against Talleres de Córdoba from Argentina. A real disappointment to the fans.

In the year 2001, they once again played the Copa Libertadores and beat rivals such as San Lorenzo from Argentina and Jorge Wilstermann from Bolivia. Once again they made it into the round of sixteen but lost this time to Vasco da Gama from Brazil who had top class players like Romário in their team.

In 2002 the club were again relegated by finishing 15th of 16 teams in the aggregated table, they returned to the top flight in 2004.

In the year 2006 the team was suspended and could not play professionally in the whole year due to debts and unpaid salaries. The club was going to be relegated, but after a legal battle, they were readmitted in the Chilean first division, where they play in 2007. An alternative team (Deportes Concepción B) played that season at the Third level, as well.

In 2016 the club was expelled of the Chilean National League system due to economic problems. And returned in 2018 at last level of the league system, the fifth tier, Tercera B, gaining promotion in their debut season on the category to the next level, the fourth tier Tercera División, for 2019, in which they get a consecutive promotion to the next level, the third tier Segunda División, for 2020.

Club Facts
Seasons in Primera División (I): 33 (1968–81), (1985–93), (1995–02), (2005), (2007–08)
Seasons in Primera B  (II): 11 (1966–67), (1982–84), (1994), (2003–04), (2009–2016)
Seasons in Segunda División (III): 3 (2020–)
Seasons in Tercera División (IV): 1 (2019)
Seasons in Tercera B (V): 1 (2018)
Copa Libertadores appearances: 2 (1991, 2001)
Copa CONMEBOL appearances: 1 (1999)
Largest Margin of Victory: 7–1 vs. Santiago Morning (1976)
Largest Margin of Defeat: 0–7 vs Universidad de Chile (1987)
Best Finish in Primera División: 2nd (1975)
Best Finish in Copa Chile: Runner-up (2010)
Highest home attendance  — 37,423 v. Colo-Colo (1 October 1972)
Most Goals in Primera División matches: Víctor Estay (77 goals)
All-time Goalscorer: Víctor Estay (88 goals)
All-time Appearances: Patricio Almendra (269 games)

National Honors
 Liguilla Pre-Libertadores
 Winners (2): 1990, 2000
Copa Francisco Candelori:
 Winners (1): 1970
 Primera B
 Winners (2): 1967, 1994

Crest

South American cups history

Current squad

2021 Winter Transfers

In

Out

Managers

See also
Chilean football league system

References

External links
 Official Website

Football clubs in Chile
Association football clubs established in 1966
Sport in Biobío Region
1966 establishments in Chile
Concepción, Chile